Mel Welles (February 17, 1924 – August 19, 2005) was an American film actor and director. His best-remembered role may be that of hapless flower shop owner Gravis Mushnick in the 1960 low-budget Roger Corman dark comedy, The Little Shop of Horrors.

Life and career
Welles was born Ira W. Meltcher in the Bronx, New York City, son of Max and Sally Grichewsky Meltcher. He was raised in Mount Carmel, Pennsylvania and graduated from Mt. Carmel High School, in 1940. He went on to receive a Bachelor of Arts degree from Penn State University, a Master of Arts degree from West Virginia University, and a Ph.D. in psychology from Columbia University.

Welles held a number of jobs during his lifetime; at one time or another he worked as a clinical psychologist, radio DJ, television actor, writer and film director. He did some stage work before traveling to Hollywood, where in 1953 he appeared in his first film, Appointment in Honduras. His favorite role (The Little Shop of Horrors) was also his last in the U.S. for many years.

In the early 1960s, he left the United States initially to make a film in Germany. After the producer was arrested he travelled to Rome to act, produce and direct mostly uncredited primarily in Europe several film productions including the cult horror films Maneater of Hydra (1967) and Lady Frankenstein (1971). His fluency in five languages proved to be most helpful where he started a dubbing company that by his own estimate dubbed over 800 European made films. He also served as a film consultant. Later, he returned to the U.S., appearing in a number of films, doing voice work, and teaching voice acting.

Probably his most widely seen work in the late 1970s was his English adaptation of the Japanese television show, Spectreman which was seen on UHF and cable across the United States. While he shares writing credit with two other people, it's clear that most of the English voice work, and the offbeat humor, is his. Reportedly, Welles also wrote gag material for Lord Buckley at some point in his career.

In 1998, Welles took to the stage in a community theater production of Little Shop of Horrors as Mushnik, the role he created in the original Roger Corman film. Welles had never performed in the musical and was happy to be asked to do the role, which he described as a "mitzvah" for Scotts Valley Performing Arts. Jonathan Haze, who played Seymour in the original film, attended the opening, and Welles also received a visit from Martin P. Robinson, the designer of the Audrey II plant puppets used in the off-Broadway production (Robinson is also famous for his puppetry on Sesame Street).

Arguably his most remembered piece is the beat poem he wrote for the classic film High School Confidential (1958).  Famously delivered by Phillipa Fallon, Dragsville, has become a classic piece of literary and cinema history.

Welles was working on a horror screenplay, tentatively titled House of a Hundred Horrors, at the time of his death.

Filmography

The Golden Blade (1953) .... Minor Role (uncredited)
Gun Fury (1953) .... Pete Barratto (uncredited)
Appointment in Honduras (1953) .... Hidalgo (uncredited)
Jesse James vs. the Daltons (1954) .... Lou - Deputy on Train (uncredited)
Yankee Pasha (1954) .... Servant (uncredited)
Massacre Canyon (1954) .... Gonzáles
Pushover (1954) .... Detective (uncredited)
Bengal Brigade (1954) .... Merchant (uncredited)
The Silver Chalice (1954) .... Marcos (uncredited)
The Racers (1955) .... Fiori (uncredited)
Pirates of Tripoli (1955) .... Gen. Tomedi
Wyoming Renegades (1955) .... 'Whiskey' Pearson
Soldier of Fortune (1955) .... Fernand Rocha
Abbott and Costello Meet the Mummy (1955) .... Iben
Spy Chasers (1955) .... Nick (uncredited)
The Big Knife (1955) .... Mustached Party Guest (uncredited)
Duel on the Mississippi (1955) .... Sheriff
Hold Back Tomorrow (1955) .... First Guard
Kismet (1955) .... Beggar (uncredited)
The Fighting Chance (1955) .... Al Moreno
Meet Me in Las Vegas (1956) .... Roulette Player (uncredited)
Outside the Law (1956) .... Milo
Calling Homicide (1956) .... Valensi (uncredited)
Flight to Hong Kong (1956) .... Boris
Code of Silence (1957)
Attack of the Crab Monsters (1957) .... Jules Deveroux
Hold That Hypnotist (1957) .... Blackbeard
The Undead (1957) .... Smolkin, the gravedigger
The Shadow on the Window (1957) .... Polikoff (uncredited)
Rock All Night (1957) .... Sir Bop
Designing Woman (1957) .... Solly Horzmann (uncredited)
The 27th Day (1957) .... Russian Marshal (uncredited)
Hell on Devil's Island (1957) .... Felix Molyneaux
Tip on a Dead Jockey (1957) .... El Fuad (uncredited)
The Walter Winchell File ("The Bargain", 1958) .... Friend
The Brothers Karamazov (1958) .... Trifon Borissovitch
High School Confidential! (1958) .... Charlie O'Flair
Hakuja den (1958) .... The Wizard (English version, voice)
Cone of Silence (1960) .... Max Frankel
The Little Shop of Horrors (1960) .... Mushnick
Hemingway's Adventures of a Young Man (1962) .... Italian Sergeant (uncredited)
Lo Sceicco Rosso (1962) .... Hassan
The Reluctant Saint (1962)
The Keeler Affair (1963) .... Yevgeni Ivanovich
Un commerce tranquille (1964) .... Antonio
Panic Button (1964)
Our Man in Jamaica (1965, director)
The She Beast (1966) .... Ladislav Groper
Maneater of Hydra (1967, director)
The X from Outer Space (1967) .... Berman (English version, voice, uncredited)
Llaman de Jamaica, Mr. Ward (1968)
The Great Silence (1968) .... Henry Pollicut (English version, voice, uncredited)
Die Grosse Treibjagd (1968) .... (uncredited director and cameo)
Machine Gun McCain (1969) .... Duke Mazzanga (English version, voice, uncredited)
Lady Frankenstein (1971, director) .... Tom (voice, uncredited)
Cut-Throats Nine (1972) .... Ray (English version, voice, uncredited)
Amarcord (1973) .... Temperance / Walla (English version, voice, uncredited)
Joyride to Nowhere (1977) .... Tank McCall
Dr. Heckyl and Mr. Hype (1980) .... Dr. Vince Hinkle
Faeries (1981) .... Trow / Hunter (voice)
Wolfen (1981) .... ESS Voice (voice)
Smokey Bites the Dust (1981) .... Abu Habib Bibubu
Body and Soul (1981) .... Joe Gillardi
The Last American Virgin (1982) .... Druggist
Homework (1982) .... Doctor 
Chopping Mall (1986) .... Cook
Commando Squad (1987) .... Quintano
Invasion Earth: The Aliens Are Here (1988) .... Mr. Davar
Rented Lips (1988) .... Milo
Wizards of the Lost Kingdom II (1989) .... Caedmon
Raising Dead (2002) .... Police Dispatcher

Notes

External links

1924 births
2005 deaths
Male actors from New York City
American male film actors
Film directors from New York City
Columbia University alumni
Pennsylvania State University alumni
West Virginia University alumni
20th-century American male actors